The 1995 European Ladies' Team Championship took place 12–16 July at Golf Club Milano in Monza, Italy. It was the 19th women's golf amateur European Ladies' Team Championship.

Venue 
The hosting club was founded in 1928. The course, situated in Monza Park, the largest walled park in Europe, 20 kilometres north of the city center of Milan, Lombardy region in northern Italy, was designed by architect James Peter Gannon.

The championship course was set up with par 72.

Format 
All participating teams played two qualification rounds of stroke-play with six players, counted the five best scores for each team.

The eight best teams formed flight A, in knock-out match-play over the next three days. The teams were seeded based on their positions after the stroke-play. The first placed team was drawn to play the quarter final against the eight placed team, the second against the seventh, the third against the sixth and the fourth against the fifth. In each match between two nation teams, two 18-hole foursome games and five 18-hole single games were played. Teams were allowed to switch players during the team matches, selecting other players in to the afternoon single games after the morning foursome games. Games all square after 18 holes were declared halved, if the team match was already decided.

The seven teams placed 9–15 in the qualification stroke-play formed flight B and the four teams placed 16–19 formed flight C, to play similar knock-out match-play, with one foursome game and four single games, to decide their final positions.

Teams 
A record number of 19 nation teams contested the event. Each team consisted of six players.

Players in the leading teams

Other participating teams

Winners 
Team Spain won the opening 36-hole qualifying competition, with a score of 15 over par 735, one stroke ahead of team Sweden.

Individual leader in the 36-hole stroke-play competition was Vibeke Stensrud, Norway, with a score of 4 under par 140, two strokes ahead of nearest competitors.

Team Spain won the championship, beating Scotland 5–2 in the final and earned their first title. Team England earned third place, beating Denmark 4–3 in the bronze match.

Results 
Qualification round

Team standings

Individual leaders

 Note: There was no official award for the lowest individual score.

Flight A

Bracket

Final games

Flight B

Bracket

Flight C

Bracket

Final standings

Sources:

See also 
 Espirito Santo Trophy – biennial world amateur team golf championship for women organized by the International Golf Federation.
 European Amateur Team Championship – European amateur team golf championship for men organised by the European Golf Association.

References

External links 
 European Golf Association: Results

European Ladies' Team Championship
Golf tournaments in Italy
European Ladies' Team Championship
European Ladies' Team Championship
European Ladies' Team Championship